A design director is a position usually found within the software development, web development, product design, advertising, media, automotive or movie industries, but may be useful in other product focused organizations as well. The duties has similarities to that of a creative instructor but with a greater emphasis on technical design and production, rather than just creative and ideas. The design director oversees the design of branding, product, UI, UX,  Print, Advertising for a client, ensuring that the design elements fits in with the client's requirements and the product fits the design brief the client  wish to promote for their company or product. However, unlike a creative director, the design director is also responsible for the overall quality of the final creative work and the quality of the project's design elements.

Whereas distinction between the two positions is that advertising creative directors are usually promoted from copywriting or art directing positions. Design directors, on the other hand, are promoted from senior designer positions. Design directors also require a much greater technical understanding of design process and techniques with cross platform and multi-disciplinary team application of their work also common place. As a role design directors are not only concerned with the creative elements, but also business, production and user facing experiences.

See also
 Design
 Creativity
 Artistic inspiration
 Communication

References

Advertising occupations
Arts occupations
Communication design
Design